The 1987 Hawaii Rainbow Warriors football team represented the University of Hawaiʻi at Mānoa in the Western Athletic Conference during the 1987 NCAA Division I-A football season. In their first season under head coach Bob Wagner, the Rainbow Warriors compiled a 5–7 record.

Schedule

Personnel

References

Hawaii
Hawaii Rainbow Warriors football seasons
Hawaii Rainbow Warriors football